Arthur C. "Archie" Verow (March 14, 1942 – December 19, 2019) was an American politician from Maine.

Verow was born in Old Town, Maine. He graduated from Husson University in 1966. A Democrat, Verow served in the Maine House of Representatives since 2019, representing the 128th district. He previously served in the Maine House of Representatives from 2013 until 2017. He served as the mayor of Brewer, Maine. Verow died on December 19, 2019, after a heart attack, while still in office.

References

1942 births
2019 deaths
People from Brewer, Maine
People from Old Town, Maine
Husson University alumni
Mayors of places in Maine
Democratic Party members of the Maine House of Representatives
Maine city council members
21st-century American politicians